Luís Miguel Pinheiro Andrade (born 27 March 1990), known as Luisinho, is a Portuguese professional footballer who plays for Académico de Viseu F.C. as a left winger.

Club career
Born in Fornos de Algodres, Guarda District, Luisinho played lower league football until the age of 23. He joined Académico de Viseu F.C. in December 2010, and helped it promote from the fourth division to the second in his first two full seasons, scoring seven goals in the process.

Luisinho made his professional debut on 27 July 2013, starting in a 1–0 home win against Atlético Clube de Portugal in the first round of the Portuguese League Cup. His maiden appearance in the second tier occurred on 10 August, as he came on as a second-half substitute in a 2–0 loss at Moreirense FC.

Luisinho first arrived in the Primeira Liga in 2015–16, signing a two-year contract with Boavista F.C. at the age of 25. He scored in his first game in the competition, helping to a 2–2 away draw to Vitória de Setúbal. He returned to division two the following season, being loaned to former club Académico Viseu.

On 18 July 2017, Luisinho agreed to a one-year deal with Académica de Coimbra.

References

External links

1990 births
Living people
People from Fornos de Algodres
Sportspeople from Guarda District
Portuguese footballers
Association football wingers
Primeira Liga players
Liga Portugal 2 players
Segunda Divisão players
FC Pampilhosa players
Académico de Viseu F.C. players
Boavista F.C. players
Associação Académica de Coimbra – O.A.F. players